Confidence Girl is a 1952 American crime film written and directed by Andrew L. Stone. The film stars Tom Conway, Hillary Brooke, Eddie Marr, John Gallaudet, Jack Kruschen, Dan Riss and Walter Kingsford. It was released on June 20, 1952 by United Artists.

Plot

Con man Roger Kingsley convinces the Los Angeles police that, acting as an insurance company's investigator, he can help them apprehend a notorious swindler, a woman named Mary Webb.

Kingsley sets a trap at a department store and nabs Webb as she steals a mink coat. But while the store detective is contacting police, Webb, who is actually Kingsley's girlfriend, is permitted to escape. However, Kingsley has gained the trust of the police.

In a second scam, Webb and Kingsley bilk a pawnshop owner out of several thousand dollars. She then prepares for their biggest con yet, a stage act at Johnny Gregg's nightclub in which Webb will pose as a clairvoyant. Her psychic powers amaze Gregg's customers, but the act is just an elaborate ruse.

The suspicious police set a trap. A dentist named Braddock is implicated in a murder, but while trying to save the life of whom she believes to be an innocent man, Webb is tricked into confessing her scam in front of the club's entire audience. She and Kingsley are taken to jail.

Cast 

Tom Conway as Roger Kingsley	
Hillary Brooke as Mary Webb 
Eddie Marr as Johnny Gregg
John Gallaudet as Detective Chief Brownell
Jack Kruschen as Detective Sergeant Quinn
Dan Riss as Detective Lieutenant Fenton
Walter Kingsford as Mr. Markewell
Paul Livermore as Hal Speel
Aline Towne as Peggy Speel
Helen Van Tuyl as Maggie
Edmund Cobb as Detective Lieutenant Cobb
Truman Bradley as Narrator 
Leo Cleary as Mr. Sheridan
Roy Engel as Store Detective Walsh
Charles Collins as Charlie
Yvonne Peattie as Gertrude Palmer
Joel Allen as Frank Palmer
Helen Chapman as Joey Ridgway
John Phillips as Allen Ridgeway
Margo Karen as Hilda
Bruce Edwards as 1st Detective
Tyler McVey as 2nd Detective
Paul Guilfoyle as William Pope
Michael Vallon as Richard Downs
Barbara Woodell as Miss Seabury
Madge Crane as Mrs. Markwell
Pamela Duncan as Braddock's Nurse
Carmen Clothier as Fur Saleswoman
Gil Frye as Nightclub Accomplice at Phone
Duke York as Nightclub Accomplice with Binoculars

References

External links
 

1952 films
1952 crime films
American black-and-white films
American crime films
Films about con artists
Films directed by Andrew L. Stone
United Artists films
1950s English-language films
1950s American films